Małgorzata Ignasiak (born 18 January 1995) is a Polish Paralympic athlete who competes in sprinting events in international level events. She is one of few T12 categorised athletes to run without a running guide.

References

1995 births
Living people
Sportspeople from Kalisz
Paralympic athletes of Poland
Polish female sprinters
21st-century Polish women